This is a list of butterflies of Benin. About 470 species are known from Benin, none of which are endemic.

Papilionidae

Papilioninae
14 species

Papilionini
Papilio nireus  Linnaeus, 1758
Papilio chrapkowskoides nurettini  Koçak, 1983
Papilio sosia  Rothschild & Jordan, 1903
Papilio dardanus  Brown, 1776
Papilio phorcas  Cramer, 1775
Papilio demodocus  Esper, [1798]

Leptocercini
Graphium antheus (Cramer, 1779)
Graphium policenes (Cramer, 1775)
Graphium angolanus baronis (Ungemach, 1932)
Graphium leonidas (Fabricius, 1793)
Graphium adamastor (Boisduval, 1836)
Graphium agamedes (Westwood, 1842)

Pieridae
43 species

Coliadinae
Eurema brigitta (Stoll, [1780])
Eurema desjardinsii marshalli (Butler, 1898)
Eurema hapale (Mabille, 1882)
Eurema hecabe solifera (Butler, 1875)
Eurema senegalensis (Boisduval, 1836)
Catopsilia florella (Fabricius, 1775)

Pierinae
Colotis antevippe (Boisduval, 1836)
Colotis aurora evarne (Klug, 1829)
Colotis euippe (Linnaeus, 1758)
Colotis evagore antigone (Boisduval, 1836)
Nepheronia pharis (Boisduval, 1836)
Nepheronia thalassina (Boisduval, 1836)
Leptosia alcesta (Stoll, [1782])
Leptosia marginea (Mabille, 1890)
Leptosia wigginsi pseudalcesta Bernardi, 1965

Pierini
Appias epaphia (Cramer, [1779])
Appias phaola (Doubleday, 1847)
Appias sylvia (Fabricius, 1775)
Mylothris chloris (Fabricius, 1775)
Dixeia capricornus (Ward, 1871)
Belenois aurota (Fabricius, 1793)
Belenois calypso (Drury, 1773)
Belenois creona (Cramer, [1776])
Belenois hedyle (Cramer, 1777)
Belenois theora (Doubleday, 1846)

Lycaenidae
127 species

Miletinae

Miletini
Lachnocnema vuattouxi Libert, 1996

Poritiinae

Liptenini
Pentila pauli Staudinger, 1888
Pentila petreia Hewitson, 1874
Mimeresia libentina (Hewitson, 1866)
Liptena septistrigata (Bethune-Baker, 1903)
Tetrarhanis symplocus Clench, 1965
Pseuderesia eleaza (Hewitson, 1873)
Citrinophila similis (Kirby, 1887)

Aphnaeinae
Lipaphnaeus leonina ivoirensis Stempffer, 1966
Cigaritis mozambica (Bertoloni, 1850)
Zeritis neriene Boisduval, 1836
Axiocerses harpax (Fabricius, 1775)
Aphnaeus brahami Lathy, 1903

Theclinae
Myrina silenus (Fabricius, 1775)
Dapidodigma demeter (Clench, 1961)
Hypolycaena philippus (Fabricius, 1793)
Pilodeudorix catalla (Karsch, 1895)
Paradeudorix eleala viridis (Stempffer, 1964)
Hypomyrina mimetica Libert, 2004
Deudorix antalus (Hopffer, 1855)
Deudorix dinomenes diomedes Jackson, 1966
Deudorix odana Druce, 1887

Polyommatinae

Lycaenesthini
Anthene amarah (Guérin-Méneville, 1849)
Anthene liodes (Hewitson, 1874)
Anthene lunulata (Trimen, 1894)
Anthene princeps (Butler, 1876)
Anthene starki Larsen, 2005
Anthene sylvanus (Drury, 1773)
Anthene hades (Bethune-Baker, 1910)

Polyommatini
Cupidopsis jobates mauritanica Riley, 1932
Lampides boeticus (Linnaeus, 1767)
Cacyreus lingeus (Stoll, 1782)
Leptotes babaulti (Stempffer, 1935)
Leptotes jeanneli (Stempffer, 1935)
Leptotes pirithous (Linnaeus, 1767)
Zizeeria knysna (Trimen, 1862)
Zizina antanossa (Mabille, 1877)
Actizera lucida (Trimen, 1883)
Zizula hylax (Fabricius, 1775)
Azanus jesous (Guérin-Méneville, 1849)
Azanus mirza (Plötz, 1880)
Azanus moriqua (Wallengren, 1857)
Azanus natalensis (Trimen & Bowker, 1887)
Euchrysops malathana (Boisduval, 1833)
Freyeria trochylus (Freyer, [1843])
Lepidochrysops quassi (Karsh, 1895)
Lepidochrysops victoriae occidentalis Libert & Collins, 2001

Nymphalidae
177 species

Libytheinae
Libythea labdaca Westwood, 1851

Danainae

Danaini
Danaus chrysippus chrysippus (Linnaeus, 1758)
Danaus chrysippus alcippus (Cramer, 1777)
Tirumala petiverana (Doubleday, 1847)
Amauris niavius (Linnaeus, 1758)
Amauris tartarea Mabille, 1876
Amauris crawshayi camerunica Joicey & Talbot, 1925
Amauris damocles (Fabricius, 1793)
Amauris hecate (Butler, 1866)

Satyrinae

Elymniini
Elymniopsis bammakoo (Westwood, [1851])

Melanitini
Gnophodes betsimena parmeno Doubleday, 1849
Melanitis leda (Linnaeus, 1758)

Satyrini
Bicyclus angulosa (Butler, 1868)
Bicyclus campus (Karsch, 1893)
Bicyclus dorothea (Cramer, 1779)
Bicyclus ignobilis (Butler, 1870)
Bicyclus milyas (Hewitson, 1864)
Bicyclus safitza (Westwood, 1850)
Bicyclus sandace (Hewitson, 1877)
Bicyclus vulgaris (Butler, 1868)
Bicyclus xeneas occidentalis Condamin, 1965
Ypthima doleta Kirby, 1880
Ypthimomorpha itonia (Hewitson, 1865)

Charaxinae

Charaxini
Charaxes varanes vologeses (Mabille, 1876)
Charaxes fulvescens senegala van Someren, 1975
Charaxes boueti Feisthamel, 1850
Charaxes jasius Poulton, 1926
Charaxes epijasius Reiche, 1850
Charaxes legeri Plantrou, 1978
Charaxes castor (Cramer, 1775)
Charaxes brutus (Cramer, 1779)
Charaxes numenes (Hewitson, 1859)
Charaxes tiridates (Cramer, 1777)
Charaxes imperialis Butler, 1874
Charaxes etesipe (Godart, 1824)
Charaxes achaemenes atlantica van Someren, 1970
Charaxes anticlea (Drury, 1782)
Charaxes virilis van Someren & Jackson, 1952
Charaxes plantroui , 1975
Charaxes lactetinctus  Karsch, 1892
 Charaxes nichetes leopardinus  Plantrou, 1974

Euxanthini
Charaxes eurinome (Cramer, 1775)

Pallini
Palla violinitens (Crowley, 1890)

Nymphalinae

Nymphalini
Vanessa cardui (Linnaeus, 1758)
Junonia chorimene (Guérin-Méneville, 1844)
Junonia hierta cebrene Trimen, 1870
Junonia oenone (Linnaeus, 1758)
Junonia orithya madagascariensis Guenée, 1865
Junonia sophia (Fabricius, 1793)
Junonia terea (Drury, 1773)
Junonia westermanni Westwood, 1870
Junonia cymodoce (Cramer, 1777)
Salamis cacta (Fabricius, 1793)
Protogoniomorpha parhassus (Drury, 1782)
Protogoniomorpha cytora (Doubleday, 1847)
Precis ceryne ceruana Rothschild & Jordan, 190
Precis octavia (Cramer, 1777)
Precis pelarga (Fabricius, 1775)
Hypolimnas misippus (Linnaeus, 1764)
Hypolimnas salmacis (Drury, 1773)
Catacroptera cloanthe ligata Rothschild & Jordan, 1903

Biblidinae

Biblidini
Byblia anvatara crameri Aurivillius, 1894
Byblia ilithyia (Drury, 1773)
Ariadne enotrea (Cramer, 1779)
Neptidopsis ophione (Cramer, 1777)
Eurytela dryope (Cramer, [1775])

Epicaliini
Sevenia umbrina (Karsch, 1892)

Limenitinae

Limenitidini
Pseudoneptis bugandensis ianthe Hemming, 1964
Pseudacraea lucretia (Cramer, [1775])

Neptidini
Neptis metella (Doubleday, 1848)
Neptis morosa Overlaet, 1955
Neptis troundi Pierre-Baltus, 1978

Adoliadini
Hamanumida daedalus (Fabricius, 1775)
Aterica galene (Brown, 1776)
Bebearia sophus (Fabricius, 1793)
Euphaedra medon (Linnaeus, 1763)
Euphaedra sarcoptera (Butler, 1871)
Euphaedra themis (Hübner, 1807)
Euphaedra janetta (Butler, 1871)
Euphaedra ceres ceres (Fabricius, 1775)
Euphaedra ceres lutescens Hecq, 1979
Euphaedra phaethusa (Butler, 1866)
Euphaedra edwardsii (van der Hoeven, 1845)
Euphaedra harpalyce (Cramer, 1777)
Euptera elabontas (Hewitson, 1871)

Heliconiinae

Acraeini
Acraea camaena (Drury, 1773)
Acraea neobule Doubleday, 1847
Acraea zetes (Linnaeus, 1758)
Acraea caecilia (Fabricius, 1781)
Acraea pseudegina Westwood, 1852
Acraea acerata Hewitson, 1874
Acraea encedana Pierre, 1976
Acraea encedon (Linnaeus, 1758)
Acraea serena (Fabricius, 1775)
Acraea lycoa Godart, 1819
Acraea translucida Eltringham, 1912

Vagrantini
Phalanta eurytis (Doubleday, 1847)
Phalanta phalantha aethiopica (Rothschild & Jordan, 1903)

Hesperiidae
109 species

Coeliadinae
Coeliades chalybe (Westwood, 1852)
Coeliades forestan (Stoll, [1782])
Coeliades pisistratus (Fabricius, 1793)

Pyrginae

Celaenorrhinini
Eretis lugens (Rogenhofer, 1891)
Sarangesa bouvieri (Mabille, 1877)

Carcharodini
Spialia spio (Linnaeus, 1764)
Gomalia elma (Trimen, 1862)

Hesperiinae

Aeromachini
Pardaleodes edipus (Stoll, 1781)
Pardaleodes incerta murcia (Plötz, 1883)
Andronymus neander (Plötz, 1884)
Zophopetes cerymica (Hewitson, 1867)
Monza cretacea (Snellen, 1872)

Baorini
Pelopidas mathias (Fabricius, 1798)

See also
Geography of Benin
Guinean forest-savanna mosaic

References

Seitz, A. Die Gross-Schmetterlinge der Erde 13: Die Afrikanischen Tagfalter. Plates 
Seitz, A. Die Gross-Schmetterlinge der Erde 13: Die Afrikanischen Tagfalter. Text (in German)

Benin
Benin
Butterflies
Benin
Benin